Stephen Tate is a British actor and musical theatre artist.

Career

Television
He is possibly best known for his recurring role as Alan in the 1970s television drama Survivors and as Dick Meyer in the 1980s comedy drama Big Deal alongside Ray Brooks.

His other credits include Z-Cars, The Onedin Line, Blake's 7, Yes Minister, The Black Adder, Dear John, Boon, The Bill, Minder, Cardiac Arrest, Yes, Minister, Silent Witness and Emmerdale. He played Monsieur Fauchlevant in the 2012 film version of Les Misérables

Musical theatre
Tate has had a distinguished career in London's West End: 
Judas in Jesus Christ Superstar
Gus the Theatre Cat and Growltiger in the original West End production of Cats
Thenardier in Les Misérables. 
Created the role of Richard I (Richard the Lionheart) in Blondel.

Since 16 July 2007, he has starred as Jacob/Guru/Potiphar in Joseph and the Amazing Technicolour Dreamcoat (Adelphi, West End). He also starred as Jesus Christ in the Christian band and DVD "Hero".

Filmography

Film

Television

External links
 

British male television actors
Living people
Year of birth missing (living people)
British male musical theatre actors